Maesa velutina is a species of plant in the family Primulaceae. It is native to Karnataka and Kerala in India.

References

velutina
Flora of Karnataka
Flora of Kerala
Endangered plants
Taxonomy articles created by Polbot